^^ may refer to:

 A kaomoji
 Tetration, the ASCII form of the tetration operator
 Record separator, control character in the caret notation
 Logical exclusive or, operator in the GLSL language